The 2010 season was the 19th full year of competitive football in Estonia as an independent nation.

Matches
The team played total of thirteen – four UEFA Euro 2012 qualifying, two Baltic Cup and seven friendly – matches, of which they won three, drew four and lost six. They scored thirteen goals, averaging one goal per match, and conceded eighteen in these games.

Georgia vs Estonia

Estonia vs Finland
It was the farewell match for Indrek Zelinski, who acquired total of 103 caps and 27 goals. Sander Post scored his first international goal, which helped Estonia overcome Finland for the first time in 73 years. Karl Palatu was capped for the first time.

Estonia vs Croatia

Latvia vs Estonia
Sergei Mošnikov was capped for the first time.

Lithuania vs Estonia

Estonia vs Faroe Islands

Estonia vs Italy

Estonia vs Uzbekistan

Serbia vs Estonia

Estonia vs Slovenia

Estonia vs Liechtenstein
Siim Luts was capped for the first time.

China vs Estonia
Rauno Alliku, Markus Jürgenson and Marko Meerits were capped for the first time.

Qatar vs Estonia

Players
These 38 players were capped during the 2010 season (listed alphabetically):

 Mihkel Aksalu
 Rauno Alliku
 Alo Bärengrub
 Aleksandr Dmitrijev
 Alo Dupikov
 Enar Jääger
 Markus Jürgenson
 Gert Kams
 Tarmo Kink
 Ragnar Klavan

 Oliver Konsa
 Artur Kotenko
 Dmitri Kruglov
 Pavel Londak
 Siim Luts
 Marko Meerits
 Igor Morozov
 Sergei Mošnikov
 Andres Oper
 Karl Palatu

 Sergei Pareiko
 Raio Piiroja
 Sander Post
 Eino Puri
 Sander Puri
 Ats Purje
 Taavi Rähn
 Kaimar Saag
 Andrei Sidorenkov
Andrei Stepanov

 Tihhon Šišov
 Vjatšeslav Zahovaiko
 Indrek Zelinski
 Sergei Zenjov
 Taijo Teniste
 Konstantin Vassiljev
 Vladimir Voskoboinikov
 Martin Vunk

Goalscorers
4 goals
 Konstantin Vassiljev (two penalties)

2 goals
 Ats Purje

1 goals
 Tarmo Kink
 Andres Oper
 Raio Piiroja
 Sander Post
 Kaimar Saag
 Sergei Zenjov

Own goal
  Aleksandar Luković

Debutants
 Karl Palatu (#214) – on 21 May in a friendly match against Finland
 Sergei Mošnikov (#215) – on 19 June in a Baltic Cup match against Latvia
 Siim Luts (#216) – on 17 November in a friendly against Liechtenstein
 Rauno Alliku (#217–218) – on 18 December started in a friendly against China
 Markus Jürgenson (#217–218) – on 18 December started in a friendly against China
 Marko Meerits (#219) – on 18 December came on as a substitute in a friendly against China
All six were FC Flora Tallinn players at the time of their debuts.

References
All national team games

2010
2010 national football team results
National